Scott Waugh (born 1970 or 1971) is an American film director, producer, and former stunt performer, best known for directing the 2012 war film Act of Valor with Mike McCoy. He also directed the Need for Speed film adaptation. He won the "10 Directors to Watch" award at the 2012 Palm Springs International Film Festival.

He is the younger brother of Ric Roman Waugh.

Filmography

References

External links
 
 Scott Waugh biography

1970s births
Living people
American film directors
American film producers
American stunt performers